Sel is a masculine given name, a shortened form of other names, particularly Selwyn, and may refer to:

 Sel Belsham (1930–2016), New Zealand rugby league player
 Sel Hannah (1913–1991), American skier and ski-area architect
 Sel Lisle (1921–1999), Australian rugby league player
 Sel Murray (born 1917), Australian rules footballer

Australian masculine given names
Hypocorisms